Vikrambhai Arjanbhai Maadam Yadav  (born 23 March 1958) was a member of the Lok Sabha of India for two terms, from 2004 to 2014. He represented the Jamnagar constituency of Gujarat and is a member of the Indian National Congress. He lost 2014 Lok Sabha elections in Jamnagar to his niece Poonam Maadam of BJP.

References

External links
 Official biographical sketch in Parliament of India website

1958 births
Living people
People from Jamnagar
Indian National Congress politicians
India MPs 2004–2009
India MPs 2009–2014
Lok Sabha members from Gujarat
Indian National Congress politicians from Gujarat